The 34th annual Berlin International Film Festival was held from 17–28 February 1984. The festival opened with The Noah's Ark Principle by Roland Emmerich. The Golden Bear was awarded to the American film Love Streams directed by John Cassavetes. The retrospective was dedicated to German-American actor, screenwriter, producer and film director Ernst Lubitsch. The Honorary Golden Bear was awarded to American director Jules Dassin and Greek actress Melina Mercouri and the Homage section was dedicated to the couple.

Jury

The following people were announced as being on the jury for the festival:
 Liv Ullmann, actress (Norway) - Jury President
 Jules Dassin, director, screenwriter and producer (United States)
 Edward Bennett, director and screenwriter (United Kingdom)
 Manuela Cernat-Gheorghiu, film historian (Romania)
 Lana Gogoberidze, director and screenwriter (Soviet Union)
 Tullio Kezich, film critic, playwright and screenwriter (Italy)
 Steffen Kuchenreuther, producer and distributor (West Germany)
 Jeanine Meerapfel, director and screenwriter (West Germany)
 Kevin Thomas, film critic (United States)
 Mario Vargas Llosa, writer and playwright (Peru)
 Adolphe Viezzi, producer (France)

Films in competition
The following films were in competition for the Golden Bear:

Out of competition
  Marlene, directed by Maximilian Schell (West Germany)
  Nosferatu, eine Symphonie des Grauens, directed by F. W. Murnau (Germany)
  Rue barbare, directed by Gilles Béhat (France)
 El señor Galíndez, directed by Rodolfo Kuhn (Argentina, Spain)
 Star 80, directed by Bob Fosse (USA)
 Testament, directed by Lynne Littman (USA)
 Terms of Endearment, directed by James L. Brooks (USA)
 Wanderkrebs, directed by Herbert Achternbusch (West Germany)

Key
{| class="wikitable" width="550" colspan="1"
| style="background:#FFDEAD;" align="center"| †
|Winner of the main award for best film in its section
|-
| colspan="2"| The opening and closing films are screened during the opening and closing ceremonies respectively.
|}

Retrospective
The following films were shown in the retrospective dedicated to Ernst Lubitsch 1914-1933:

The following films were shown in the retrospective dedicated to Jules Dassin and Melina Mercouri:

Films in other sections
The festival's Forum section included a presentation of Memory of the Camps, a 1946 rough cut of the British feature-length account of Nazi wartime atrocities, German Concentration Camps Factual Survey, the significance of the unfinished work having only recently been understood.

Awards

The following prizes were awarded by the Jury:
 Golden Bear: Love Streams by John Cassavetes
 Silver Bear – Special Jury Prize: No habrá más penas ni olvido by Héctor Olivera
 Silver Bear for Best Director: Ettore Scola for Le Bal
 Silver Bear for Best Actress: Inna Churikova for Voenno-polevoy roman
 Silver Bear for Best Actor: Albert Finney for The Dresser
 Silver Bear for an outstanding single achievement: Monica Vitti for Flirt
 Silver Bear:
 Rembetiko by Costas Ferris
 Morgen in Alabama by Norbert Kückelmann
 Honourable Mention: Jean-Marie Straub, Danièle Huillet for Klassenverhältnisse
FIPRESCI Award
Love Streams by John Cassavetes and No habrá más penas ni olvido by Héctor Olivera

References

External links
34th Berlin International Film Festival 1984
1984 Berlin International Film Festival
Berlin International Film Festival:1984 at Internet Movie Database

34
1984 film festivals
1984 in West Germany
1980s in West Berlin
Berlin